Linthoi Chanambam is an Indian judoka who won the gold medal in the 2022 World Judo Cadets Championships at Sarajevo in the 57 kg women's event. She hails from Manipur state in India. She became the first ever Indian medalist in any age category of the World Championships.

She had earlier won a Gold medal at the Asian Cadet and Junior Judo Championships, held in Bangkok.

References

External links
 
 

Living people
Indian female judoka
21st-century Indian women
Sportspeople from Manipur
Year of birth missing (living people)